West Hill Historic District may refer to:

in the United States
West Hill Historic District (West Hartford, Connecticut), listed on the National Register of Historic Places in Connecticut
West Hill Historic District (Muscatine, Iowa), listed on the NRHP in Iowa
West Hill Residential Historic District, listed on the NRHP in Wisconsin

See also
West Hill (disambiguation)